Gravdahl is a surname. Notable people with the surname include:

Gunnar Gravdahl (1927–2015), Norwegian politician
Reidun Gravdahl (born 1948), Norwegian politician

Norwegian-language surnames